{{DISPLAYTITLE:C17H21NO5}}
The molecular formula C17H21NO5 (molar mass: 319.35 g/mol, exact mass: 319.1420 u) may refer to:

 Anisodine, also known as daturamine and α-hydroxyscopolamin
 Salicylmethylecgonine (2′-Hydroxycocaine)

Molecular formulas